Australia vs New Zealand in rugby league is a rivalry between the Australian Kangaroos and the New Zealand Kiwis in the sport of rugby league. The first match between the two sides was in 1908, with New Zealand running out 11–10 winners.

In 2003 the New Zealand Rugby League recorded the Kiwis' 100th international against Australia. However the Australian Rugby League did not, as they exclude World Cup and Super League Tests from their records.

Head to Head

Results

2010s

2000s

1990s

1980s

1970s

1960s

1950s

1940s

1930s

1910s

1900s

See also

ANZAC Test
List of New Zealand Kiwis matches
Australia–New Zealand sports rivalries
History of rugby union matches between Australia and New Zealand
Australia–New Zealand soccer rivalry
List of articles about Australia and New Zealand jointly

References

External links

Rugby league rivalries
Australia–New Zealand sports relations
Australia national rugby league team
New Zealand national rugby league team
Sports rivalries in Australia
Sports rivalries in New Zealand